Serbannes is a commune in the Allier department in Auvergne-Rhône-Alpes in central France.

Population

Administration 
 March 2001–March 2008: Jean Debut
 March 2008–current: Raymond Pourchon

See also 
 Communes of the Allier department

References 

Communes of Allier
Allier communes articles needing translation from French Wikipedia